University, formerly called Mid Levels West before 1994, is one of the 15 constituencies in the Central & Western District of Hong Kong.

The constituency is loosely based on the area around its namesake University of Hong Kong's Main Campus in Mid-Levels, with an estimated population of 18,029.

Boundaries 
University constituency is roughly based on the western portion of the Mid-levels, bounded on the north by Bonham Road and on the west by Pok Fu Lam Road, except for a small section of the latter outside HKU's Jockey Club Student Village.

The constituency covers the whole of the University of Hong Kong's Main Campus as well as the student accommodations of St. John's College and Jockey Club Student Village.

Bordering University are the constituencies of Kwun Lung, Belcher, Water Street, Centre Street, Tung Wah, Castle Road and Peak, as well as the Pokfulam constituency of Southern District.

Councillors represented

Election results

2010s

2000s

1990s

Notes

Citations

References
2011 District Council Election Results (Central & Western)
2007 District Council Election Results (Central & Western)
2003 District Council Election Results (Central & Western)
1999 District Council Election Results (Central & Western)

Constituencies of Hong Kong
Constituencies of Central and Western District Council
Mid-Levels
Constituencies established in 1994
1994 establishments in Hong Kong